Rio Branco-Plácido de Castro International Airport  is the airport serving Rio Branco, Brazil. Since April 13, 2009 the airport is named after José Plácido de Castro (1873–1908) a politician leader of the Acrean Revolution.

It is operated by Vinci SA.

History
The airport was commissioned on November 22, 1999 as a replacement to Presidente Médici International Airport, which was then closed.

Previously operated by Infraero, on April 7, 2021 Vinci SA won a 30-year concession to operate the airport.

Airlines and destinations

Accidents and incidents
30 August 2002: a Rico Linhas Aéreas Embraer EMB 120ER Brasília registration PT-WRQ, operating flight 4823 en route from Tarauacá to Rio Branco crashed on approach to Rio Branco during a rainstorm, 1.5 km short of the runway. Of the 31 passengers and crew aboard, 23 died.

Access

See also

List of airports in Brazil

References

External links

Airports in Acre (state)
Airports established in 1999
1999 establishments in Brazil
Rio Branco, Acre